Bee Leader is a game about collecting the most nectar and turning it into honey before the sun sets. It was released by Flightless.

Gameplay 

The goal of the game is to collect the most nectar and turn it into honey before the sun sets. This is done by collecting nectar from flowers or from dandelions suspended in the air. There are also obstacles to avoid and depend on the type of level the player selects (sharks and volcanos in island levels or birds and wasps in country levels). Helper bees are also scattered across the level. If the player brings back enough nectar they will be able to move on to the next level.

Reception 

Bee Leader received "generally favorable" reviews according to review aggregator Metacritic.

Gamezebo gave the game 4 out of 5 stars praising its "gorgeous visuals", "incredibly addictive gameplay" and "clever level design" while criticizing the fact that the "controls are a little spastic".

Notes

References

External links 

 Official website
2012 video games
IOS games
Android (operating system) games
MacOS games
Video games about insects
Windows games
Windows Phone games